Panotima is a genus of moths of the family Crambidae.

Species
Panotima angularis (Hampson, 1897)
Panotima copidosema Meyrick, 1934
Panotima luculenta Ghesquière, 1942
Panotima shafferi Viette, 1989

References

Natural History Museum Lepidoptera genus database

Musotiminae
Crambidae genera
Taxa named by Edward Meyrick